Nai Roshni may refer to:
 Nai Roshni (1941 film), an Indian drama film
 Nai Roshni (1967 film), a Bollywood film